Gilboa Township is one of eleven townships in Benton County, Indiana. As of the 2020 census, its population was 282 and it contained 100 housing units. It is named for Mount Gilboa, a prominence in the southern part of the township. It was created in 1866 out of the northern part of Pine Township, after the petition of 21 residents there.

Geography

Adjacent townships
 Center (southwest)
 Pine (south)
 Union (west)
 Carpenter Township, Jasper County (north)
 Princeton Township, White County (northeast)
 Round Grove Township, White County (southeast)
 West Point Township, White County (east)

Tri-County School Corporation Education
Gilboa Township is served by the Tri-County School Corporation which also serves Carpenter Township in Jasper County and Princeton, West Point, and Round Grove Townships in White County.

References

Citations

Sources
 
 United States Census Bureau cartographic boundary files

External links

 Indiana Township Association
 United Township Association of Indiana

Townships in Benton County, Indiana
Lafayette metropolitan area, Indiana
Townships in Indiana